Lt Col Alexander Dron Stewart IMS CIE FRSE FRCPE FRCSE MID LLD (1883–1969) was a 20th-century Scottish physician and public health expert associated with India.

He was joint founder of the Indian National Science Academy in 1935.

Life
He was born in Blairgowrie in Perthshire on 22 June 1883, the son of William Stewart. He was educated at the High School of Dundee and studied medicine at the University of Edinburgh graduating with an MB ChB in 1906. He was commissioned into the Indian Army on 1 September 1906.

In the First World War he served as a surgeon in Gallipoli, Salonika and Mesopotamia. He was mentioned in dispatches and promoted to Major in March 1918. After the war he did further training in public health in Edinburgh.

He left India permanently in 1935 and settled in Edinburgh.

From 1935 to 1948 he was Superintendent of the Edinburgh Royal Infirmary on Lauriston Place. In 1936 he was elected a Fellow of the Royal Society of Edinburgh. His proposers were Anderson Gray McKendrick, William Glen Liston, Sir David Wilkie, and William Frederick Harvey. In 1938 he was elected to the Aesculapian Club of Edinburgh and from 1949-55 served as Honorary Secretary. 

He died in Edinburgh on 16 August 1969.

Family
In 1916 he married Isobel Marguerite Mann (d.1964).

Publications
Public Health Laboratory Practice

References

1883 births
1969 deaths
People from Blairgowrie and Rattray
People educated at the High School of Dundee
Alumni of the University of Edinburgh
Scottish surgeons
Fellows of the Royal Society of Edinburgh
20th-century surgeons